Unstaged (also known as American Express Unstaged or Unstaged: An Original Series from American Express) is a series of individual concert films sponsored by American Express. The live performances by various artists are filmed by the various directors listed below and are usually streamed live on the artists' official VEVO channel on YouTube. In addition, Unstaged has also produced non-concert programs including fashion shows and the Emmy Award winning The Taylor Swift Experience, which gave viewers access to a customizable 360° view of the music video for "Blank Space". Since 2020, instead of being broadcast live, all films have been pre-recorded instead due to the COVID-19 pandemic.

References

Concert films
American Express